Shanti Kranti ( Peace and Revolution) is a 1991 Indian multilingual film written, produced and directed by V. Ravichandran under his Eshwari Productions banner. The film starred himself in lead role, with Juhi Chawla, Ramesh Aravind, Khushbu and Anant Nag in supporting roles. The film was simultaneously shot in Tamil, Telugu and Hindi. V. Ravichandran was the lead in the Kannada version, he portrayed Ramesh Aravind's part in Tamil and Telugu versions. Nagarjuna was the lead in Telugu version, while Rajinikanth was the lead in the Hindi and Tamil versions and the music was composed by Hamsalekha.

Cast

V. Ravichandran as Inspector Subhash
Ramesh Aravind as Inspector Bharath
Juhi Chawla as Jyoti
Khushbu as Rekha
Anant Nag as Daddy
Srinath
Baby Anu Prabhakar
Baby Sangita
Babu Antony
Annapoorna
Rekha Das

Soundtrack

Hamsalekha composed the music for the film and the soundtracks. The album has nine tracks.

References

External links
 

1991 films
1990s Kannada-language films
Films scored by Hamsalekha
Films directed by V. Ravichandran
Indian multilingual films
Indian action films
1991 action films
1991 multilingual films